Hebenstretia hamulosa is a species of plant from South Africa. It belongs to the figwort family.

Description 
It has many hairy branches growing from the base. The hairs are coarse and curve backwards. The leaves are linear with margins that range from being entire to being obscurely toothed. White flowers are found in spikes between August and October. The calyx is hairy and the hook-shaped bracts curved downwards. The two mericarps making up the fruit are of equal size. They are both round in cross-section.

Distribution and habitat 
Hebenstretia hamulosa is endemic to the Northern Cape of South Africa.

Conservation 
This species is considered to be of least concern.

References 

Plants described in 1838
Flora of South Africa
Scrophulariaceae